This is a list of butterflies of Yemen. About 117 species are known from Yemen.

Papilionidae

Papilioninae

Papilionini
Papilio saharae rathjensi Warnecke, 1932
Papilio demodocus demodocus Esper, [1798]
Papilio demodocus bennetti Dixey, 1898

Pieridae

Coliadinae
Eurema brigitta (Stoll, [1780])
Colias marnoana Rogenhofer, 1884

Pierinae
Colotis antevippe zera (Lucas, 1852)
Colotis daira (Klug, 1829)
Colotis ephyia (Klug, 1829)
Colotis euippe exole (Reiche, 1850)
Colotis evagore evagore (Klug, 1829)
Colotis evagore niveus (Butler, 1881)
Colotis protomedia (Klug, 1829)
Colotis ungemachi (Le Cerf, 1922)
Colotis eris contractus Gabriel, 1954
Calopieris eulimene (Klug, 1829)
Nepheronia buquetii buchanani (Rothschild, 1921)

Pierini
Mylothris arabicus Gabriel, 1954
Belenois anomala (Butler, 1881)
Belenois creona leucogyne Butler, 1885

Lycaenidae

Aphnaeinae
Chloroselas arabica (Riley, 1932)
Chloroselas esmeralda bilqis Larsen, 1983
Cigaritis scotti (Gabriel, 1954)
Cigaritis somalina (Butler, 1886)
Axiocerses harpax kadugli Talbot, 1935

Theclinae
Myrina silenus nzoiae d'Abrera, 1980
Hypolycaena pachalica Butler, 1888
Hypolycaena philippus (Fabricius, 1793)
Iolaus glaucus Butler, 1886
Iolaus nursei Butler, 1896
Deudorix antalus (Hopffer, 1855)
Deudorix dinochares Grose-Smith, 1887
Deudorix livia (Klug, 1834)

Lycaeninae
Lycaena phlaeas shima Gabriel, 1954

Polyommatinae

Lycaenesthini
Anthene amarah (Guérin-Méneville, 1849)
Anthene arora Larsen, 1983
Anthene butleri arabicus Gabriel, 1954
Anthene contrastata (Ungemach, 1932)

Polyommatini
Cupidopsis jobates (Hopffer, 1855)
Cacyreus niebuhri Larsen, 1982
Cacyreus virilis Stempffer, 1936
Leptotes babaulti (Stempffer, 1935)
Leptotes brevidentatus (Tite, 1958)
Leptotes jeanneli (Stempffer, 1935)
Leptotes pirithous (Linnaeus, 1767)
Leptotes socotranus (Ogilvie-Grant, 1899)
Tuxentius gabrieli Balint, 1999
Tarucus grammicus (Grose-Smith & Kirby, 1893)
Tarucus quadratus Ogilvie-Grant, 1899
Tarucus rosacea (Austaut, 1885)
Tarucus theophrastus (Fabricius, 1793)
Zizeeria karsandra (Moore, 1865)
Zizina antanossa (Mabille, 1877)
Actizera lucida (Trimen, 1883)
Zizula hylax (Fabricius, 1775)
Azanus mirza (Plötz, 1880)
Azanus moriqua (Wallengren, 1857)
Azanus ubaldus (Stoll, 1782)
Eicochrysops distractus (de Joannis & Verity, 1913)
Euchrysops lois (Butler, 1886)
Euchrysops malathana (Boisduval, 1833)
Euchrysops osiris (Hopffer, 1855)
Euchrysops philbyi Gabriel, 1954
Chilades parrhasius (Fabricius, 1793)
Lepidochrysops arabicus Gabriel, 1954
Lepidochrysops forsskali Larsen, 1982
Lepidochrysops haveni Larsen, 1983

Nymphalidae

Danainae

Danaini
Danaus chrysippus alcippus (Cramer, 1777)

Satyrinae

Melanitini
Melanitis leda (Linnaeus, 1758)

Satyrini
Lasiommata felix (Warnecke, 1929)
Bicyclus anynana socotrana (Butler, 1881)
Ypthima asterope (Klug, 1832)
Hipparchia tewfiki (Wiltshire, 1949)

Charaxinae

Charaxini
Charaxes varanes bertrami Riley, 1931
Charaxes varanes torbeni Turlin, 1999
Charaxes balfouri Butler, 1881
Charaxes velox Ogilvie-Grant, 1899
Charaxes hansali yemeni Turlin, 1998
Charaxes bernstorffi Rydon, 1982

Nymphalinae

Nymphalini
Junonia chorimene (Guérin-Méneville, 1844)
Junonia hierta cebrene Trimen, 1870
Junonia oenone (Linnaeus, 1758)
Junonia orithya here Lang, 1884
Protogoniomorpha anacardii (Trimen, 1881)
Precis limnoria (Klug, 1845)
Hypolimnas bolina jacintha (Drury, [1773])
Hypolimnas misippus (Linnaeus, 1764)
Melitaea deserticola scotti Higgins, 1941

Biblidinae

Biblidini
Byblia anvatara acheloia (Wallengren, 1857)
Byblia anvatara boydi Dixey, 1898
Byblia ilithyia (Drury, 1773)
Eurytela dryope brittoni Gabriel, 1954

Limenitinae

Neptidini
Neptis serena annah Larsen, 1982

Adoliadini
Hamanumida daedalus (Fabricius, 1775)

Heliconiinae

Acraeini
Acraea chilo yemensis Le Doux, 1931
Acraea neobule Doubleday, 1847
Acraea doubledayi azvaki d'Abrera, 1980
Acraea encedon rathjensi Le Doux, 1933
Acraea serena (Fabricius, 1775)

Vagrantini
Phalanta phalantha granti (Rothschild & Jordan, 1903)

Hesperiidae

Coeliadinae
Coeliades anchises jucunda (Butler, 1881)

Pyrginae

Celaenorrhinini
Sarangesa phidyle (Walker, 1870)

Tagiadini
Caprona pillaana Wallengren, 1857

Carcharodini
Spialia colotes semiconfluens de Jong, 1978
Spialia diomus (Hopffer, 1855)
Spialia doris (Walker, 1870)
Spialia mafa higginsi Evans, 1937
Spialia mangana (Rebel, 1899)
Spialia spio (Linnaeus, 1764)
Spialia zebra bifida (Higgins, 1924)
Carcharodus alceae wissmanni Warnecke, 1934
Gomalia elma (Trimen, 1862)

Hesperiinae

Baorini
Borbo fatuellus (Hopffer, 1855)
Borbo gemella (Mabille, 1884)
Gegenes hottentota (Latreille, 1824)
Gegenes nostrodamus (Fabricius, 1793)
Gegenes pumilio pumilio (Hoffmansegg, 1804)
Gegenes pumilio monochroa (Rebel, 1907)

See also
List of moths of Yemen
Wildlife of Yemen

References

Lists of butterflies by location
Butterflies
Butterflies by country
Y

Butterflies